Abadan ( Ābādān) is a city and capital of Abadan County, Khuzestan Province, which is located in the southwest of Iran. It lies on Abadan Island ( long, 3–19 km or 2–12 miles wide). The island is bounded in the west by the Arvand waterway and to the east by the Bahmanshir outlet of the Karun River (the Arvand Rood),  from the Persian Gulf, near the Iran–Iraq border. Abadan is 140 km from the provincial capital city of Ahvaz.

Etymology
The earliest mention of the island of Abadan, if not the port itself, is found in works of the geographer Marcian, who renders the name "Apphadana". Earlier, the classical geographer Ptolemy notes "Apphana" as an island off the mouth of the Tigris (which is where the modern Island of Abadan is located). An etymology for this name is presented by B. Farahvashi to be derived from the Persian word "ab" (water) and the root "pā" (guard, watch) thus "coastguard station").

In Islamic times, a pseudo-etymology was produced by the historian Ahmad ibn Yahya al-Baladhuri (d. 892) quoting a folk story that the town was presumably founded by one "Abbad bin Hosayn" from the Arabian Tribe of Banu Tamim, who established a garrison there during the governorship of Hajjaj in the Ummayad period.

In the subsequent centuries, the Persian version of the name had begun to come into general use before it was adopted by official decree in 1935.

Population

The civilian population of the city dropped close to zero during the eight years of the Iran–Iraq War (1980–1988). The 1986 census recorded only 6 people. In 1991, 84,774 had returned to live in the city. By 2001, the population had jumped to 206,073, and it was 217,988, in 48,061 families, according to 2006 census. Abadan Refinery is one of the largest in the world. The population today has reached almost 350,000 people.

Only 9% of managers (of the oil company) were from Khuzestan. The proportion of natives of Tehran, the Caspian, Azerbaijan, and Kurdistan rose from 4% of blue collar workers to 22% of white collar workers to 45% of managers, thus Arabic-speakers were concentrated on the lower rungs of the work force, managers tended to be brought in from some distance. There is also a single Armenian church in the centre of the city, Saint Garapet church.

History
Abadan is thought to have been further developed into a major port city under the Abbasids' rule. The city was then a commercial source of salt and woven mats. The siltation of the river delta forced the town further away from water; In the 14th century, however, Ibn Battutah described Abadan just as a small port in a flat salty plain. Politically, Abadan was often the subject of dispute between the nearby states. In 1847, Persia acquired it from the Ottoman Empire in which state Abadan has remained since. From the 17th century onward, the island of Abadan was part of the lands of the Arab Ka'ab (Bani Kaab) tribe. One section of the tribe, Mohaysen, had its headquarters at Mohammara (now Khorramshahr), until the removal of Shaikh Khaz'al Khan in 1924.

It was not until the 20th century that rich oil fields were discovered in the area. On 16 July 1909, after secret negotiation with the British consul, Percy Cox, assisted by Arnold Wilson, and Sheik Khaz'al agreed to a rental agreement for the island, including Abadan. The Sheik continued to administer the island until 1924. The Anglo-Persian Oil Company built their first pipeline terminus oil refinery in Abadan, starting in 1909 and completing it in 1912, with oil flowing by August 1912 (see Abadan Refinery). Refinery throughput numbers rose from 33,000 tons in 1912–1913 to 4,338,000 tons in 1931. By 1938, it was the largest in the world.

During World War II, Abadan was the site of brief combat between Iranian forces and British and Indian troops during the Anglo-Soviet invasion of Iran. Later, Abadan was a major logistics centre for Lend-Lease aircraft being sent to the Soviet Union by the United States.

In 1951, Iran nationalised all oil properties and refining ground to a stop on the island. Rioting broke out in Abadan, after the government had decided to nationalise the oil facilities, and three British workers were killed. It was not until 1954 that a settlement was reached, which allowed a consortium of international oil companies to manage the production and refining on the island. That continued until 1973, when the NIOC took over all facilities. After the total nationalisation, Iran focused on supplying oil domestically and built a pipeline from Abadan to Tehran.

Abadan was not a major cultural or religious centre, but it played an important role in the Islamic Revolution. On 19 August 1978, the anniversary of the US-backed coup d'état that had overthrown the nationalist and popular Iranian prime minister, Mohammed Mossadegh, the Cinema Rex, a movie theatre in Abadan, was set ablaze. The Cinema Rex Fire caused 430 deaths, but more importantly, it was another event that kept the Islamic Revolution moving ahead. At the time, there was much confusion and misinformation about the perpetrators of the incident. The public largely put the blame on the local police chief and also the Shah and SAVAK. The reformist Sobhe Emrooz newspaper in one of its editorials revealed that the Cinema Rex was burned down by radical Islamists. The newspaper was shut down immediately after. Over time, the true culprits, radical Islamists, were apprehended, and the logic behind this act was revealed, as they were trying both to foment the general public to distrust the government even more, and they also perceived cinema as a link to the Americans. The fire was one of four during a short period in August, with other fires in Mashhad, Rizaiya, and Shiraz.
In September 1980, Abadan was almost overrun during a surprise attack on Khuzestan by Iraq, marking the beginning of the Iran–Iraq War. For 12 months, Abadan was besieged, but never captured, by Iraqi forces, and in September 1981, the Iranians broke the siege of Abadan. Much of the city, including the oil refinery, which was the world's largest refinery with capacity of 628,000 barrels per day, was badly damaged or destroyed by the siege and by bombing. Prior to the war, the city's civilian population was about 300,000, but at the war's end nearly the entire populace had sought refuge elsewhere in Iran.

After the war, the biggest concern was the rebuilding of Abadan's oil refinery, as it was operating at 10% of capacity due to damage. In 1993, the refinery began limited operation and the port reopened.  By 1997, the refinery reached the same rate of production as before the war.  Recently, Abadan has been the site of major labour activity as workers at the oil refineries in the city have staged walkouts and strikes to protest non-payment of wages and the political situation in the country.

Recent events
To honor the 100th anniversary of the refining of oil in Abadan, city officials are planning an oil museum. The Abadan oil refinery was featured on the reverse side of Iran's 100-rial banknotes printed in 1965 and from 1971 to 1973. Abadan today has been declared as a free zone city. The healthy relationship between Iran and Iraq has become one of the transit cities connecting both countries through a 40-minute drive.

Geography

Climate 
The climate in Abadan is arid (Köppen climate classification BWh) and similar to Baghdad's, but slightly hotter due to Abadan's lower latitude. Summers are dry and extremely hot, with temperatures above  almost daily and temperatures above  can be almost common. Abadan is notably one of the few hottest populated places on earth and experiences a few sand and dust storms per year. Winters are mildly wet and spring-like, though subject to cold spells with night frost. However, winters in Abadan have no snow.

Economics and Education 
The Abadan Institute of Technology was established in Abadan in 1939. The school specialized in engineering and petroleum chemistry, and was designed to train staff for the refinery in town.  The school's name has since changed several times, but since 1989 has been considered a branch campus of the Petroleum University of Technology, centred in Tehran. Abadan University of Medical Sciences, It was founded by Ministry of Health and Medical Education in September 1941 as a Nursing Faculty and in 2012 it became an independent faculty of medical school. Program study of this school is similar to curriculum that applies most Iranian medical faculties.

Abadan was chosen for constructing a refinery because of its strategic position and proximity to other resources. The Abadan Refinery construction project started in 1909 and its operation began in 1962 by a production capacity of 2500 barrels per day.

There is an international airport in Abadan.  It is represented by the IATA airport code ABD.
There is a large amount of external investment from East Asian countries that are building oil refineries and developing a lot of real estate.

Today, Abadan is known for its lively fish market where locals buy fresh catch of the day used in the many delicious seafood dishes of the city. Abadan is also part of the Arvand Free Zone, a 155 square kilometer industrial and security zone.

Major corporations

Abadan Oil Refining Co
Abadan Petrochemical Company
Iranol Oil Company
Pasargad Oil
Pars Opal Co
U-PVC Novin

KPC Karun
Yekta Tahviyeh Arvand Co
Vina Naghsh Industrial Group
Tam Arvand Machine
Afra Arvand
Homa Chemistry
Shirin Diar Arvand Co

University
Petroleum University of Technology
Abadan University of Medical Sciences
Islamic Azad University of Abadan
MehrArvand University
PNU of Abadan

Main sights

Bridge 
 Bahmanshir Bridge at Istgah-e Haft
 Imam Reza Cable Bridge

Mosques 
 Rangooniha Mosque

Museums 
 Abadan Museum
 Historical and Handwritten Documents Museum
 Abadan Gasoline House Museum
 Oil Museum of Abadan

Church 
 St. Karapet Armenian Church

Cinema 
 Cinema Naft
 Shirin Movie Theater

Notable people

 Nasser Taghvai - Director
 Amir Naderi - Director
 Ahmad Reza Abedzadeh - Football player
 Najaf Daryabandari - Writer
 Hamid Farrokhnezhad - Actor
 Bahman Golbarnezhad - Paralympic racing cyclist
 Abie Nathan - Peace activist
 Gholam Hossein Mazloumi - Football coach
 Firoozeh Dumas - Writer
 Zoya Pirzad - Writer
 Martik - Singer
 Parviz Dehdari - Football coach
 Cyma Zarghami - TV producer
 Patrik Baboumian - Strongman
 Bizhan Emkanian - Actor
 Hossein Vafaei - Snooker player
 Mehdi Hasheminasab - Football player
 Manouchehr Mohammadi - Film producer
 Nasrollah Radesh - Actor
 Sussan Babaie - Art
 Hossein Nassim - Water polo coach
 Mohsen Bayatinia - Football player
 Hossein Kanaanizadegan - Football player
 Mojahed Khaziravi - Football player
 Abdolhassan Kazemi - Retired football player
 Parviz Mazloumi - Football coach
 Farhad Hasanzadeh - Poet
 Hamid Rashidi - Lawyer
 Siroos Moghaddam - Director
 Yadolah Dodge - Professor

Transportation

By plane
The city is served by Abadan-Ayatollah Jami International Airport with flights on various commercial airlines.

By train
Nearest railway station is in Khorramshahr, about 10 km north of Abadan. Daytime trains from Ahvaz as well as overnight trains from Tehran and Mashhad are available.

Sport 
Sanat Naft Abadan F.C., is one of the Iranian football clubs that is currently competing with other teams in the Iranian Football Premier League.
Takhti Stadium, the main stadium is the city and the team.

Sister cities
 Karamay, China
 Borujerd, Iran

See also
Iran
 Abadan Crisis
 Abadan crisis timeline
 Battle of Abadan
 Bechari House
 Bostan
 Iran–Iraq War
 Khorramshahr
 Shadegan
 Susangerd
 Tidal irrigation at Abadan island, Iran

Explanatory notes

Citations

General references

Further reading

External links

 Amateur Astronomers Association of Abadan
 Abadan Oil Refinery – Home page (Persian only)
 Abadan Photo Gallery from the Khuzestan Governorship
 Abadan's travel review
 Petroleum University of Technology (Abadan)
 Abadan Social Network
 Abadan Network
 VISTA Internet Cafe

 
Arab settlements in Khuzestan Province
Cities in Khuzestan Province
Populated places in Abadan County
Shatt al-Arab basin